Troublizing is an album by Ric Ocasek, released in 1997.

Production
The album was produced in part by Billy Corgan. Melissa Auf der Maur contributed backing vocals and bass. It was recorded at Electric Lady Studios.

Critical reception
AllMusic reviewer Stephen Thomas Erlewine called Troublizing Ocasek's "best solo album since This Side of Paradise." The A.V. Club called it "a vital album that recalls the driving rock of Ocasek's much-loved former group while sounding fresher than many acts currently being passed off as cutting-edge."

The Sun Sentinel wrote that "Ocasek's music is as lean, gangly and oddly interesting as he is." The Baltimore Sun wrote that "even though the twitchy choruses, edgy textures and defiantly unfunky rhythm arrangements evoke the flat, futuristic sound Ocasek conjured with the Cars, not even the presence of synth ace Greg Hawkes makes Troublizing seem second-hand."

Track listing
 All tracks written by Ric Ocasek except "Asia Minor" written by Billy Corgan. 
 Produced by Ric Ocasek, with † co-produced by Billy Corgan.

 "The Next Right Moment"
 "Hang on Tight" 
 "Crashland Consequence" †
 "Troublizing" 
 "Not Shocked" 
 "Situation" †
 "Fix on You" †
 "People We Know" †
 "Here We Go" 
 "Society Trance" 
 "Asia Minor" †

Musicians

Ric Ocasek: Vocals, guitars, keyboards
Melissa Auf der Maur: Bass, vocals (except on track 8)
Brian Baker: Guitars (1, 2, 4, 5, 9, 10)
Billy Corgan: Guitars (1, 3, 6, 7, 8, 11), keyboards and vocals (3, 6, 8, 11)
Ira Elliot: Drums (1, 4, 5, 9, 10)
Greg Hawkes: Keyboards (1, 2, 4, 5, 9)
Matt Walker: Drums (2, 3, 6, 7, 8)

References

Ric Ocasek albums
1997 albums
Albums produced by Billy Corgan
Albums produced by Ric Ocasek
Sony Records albums
Albums recorded at Electric Lady Studios